Elkins Milling Company, also known as Darden's Mill, is a historic grist mill located at Elkins, Randolph County, West Virginia.  It is a three-story timber frame structure, eight bays long and three bays deep.  It was built in 1902, and expanded and at various points in the 20th century.  The building served Elkins and the surrounding area as a merchant grain mill and feed store.

It was listed on the National Register of Historic Places in 2005.

, the building is home to the West Virginia Railroad Museum.

References

Grinding mills on the National Register of Historic Places in West Virginia
Industrial buildings completed in 1902
Buildings and structures in Elkins, West Virginia
National Register of Historic Places in Randolph County, West Virginia
Grinding mills in West Virginia